Captain Stephen Alley MC (14 February 1876 - 1969) was a British mechanical engineer and Secret Intelligence Service (MI6) agent in pre-revolutionary Russia who may have had an involvement in the murder of Rasputin in 1916 and in a plan to try to rescue the Russian Imperial Family, the Romanovs, imprisoned in Ipatiev House in 1918 by the Bolsheviks.

Early life
Stephen Alley was born on 14 February 1876 at Arkhangelskoye Estate near Moscow. After being educated in Russia he attended King's College London where he studied English Literature, and later moved to Glasgow University where he took a degree in engineering.

He was commissioned a second-lieutenant in the Surrey Yeomanry on 18 October 1902.

Career
After university he joined the family firm of Alley & McLellan Engineers in London. In 1910 he returned to Russia, where he helped build the first heavy oil pipeline to the Black Sea. He became experienced in building rail transport. He is noted by many authors and documentaries for alleged involvement in the murder of Grigori Rasputin whilst working for the British Military Control Office in Saint Petersburg. Alley was alleged to be the author of a letter to John Scale on 25 December 1916 that, if authentic, is claimed by BBC History to be "the best proof of British involvement in Rasputin's murder." Stephen Alley participated in a plan to try to rescue the Russian Imperial Family, the Romanovs, imprisoned in the Ipatiev House in 1918 by the Bolsheviks. The plan did not work out.

Death
Alley died in 1969.

References 

World War I spies for the United Kingdom
1876 births
1969 deaths
Recipients of the Military Cross
Secret Intelligence Service personnel
British mechanical engineers
Surrey Yeomanry officers
Alumni of the University of Glasgow